Ron Allum (born 22 March 1949) is a submarine designer, cave diver and inventor.

Allum is regarded as one of the world’s most experienced and accomplished cave divers. In 1983 he led an expedition to Cocklebiddy Cave on Australia’s Nullarbor Plain.  The expedition achieved a world record push of  into the cave system.

Allum collaborated with James Cameron on a project to make a live broadcast from the wreck of the Titanic in 2005. This involved designing and building a  fiber-optic spool system link to the surface.

Allum designed the Deepsea Challenger submarine that took James Cameron to Challenger Deep. This record-breaking exploration took place on 26 March 2012.

Allum was a national finalist for Senior Australian of the Year in 2013.

In 2019, Allum appeared in episode 17 of series 3 of the children's cartoon Go Jetters, playing himself. The episode featured exploration of the Mariana Trench using the Deepsea Challenger.

References

External links 
 Ron Allum
 Ron Allum Filmography

1949 births
20th-century Australian engineers
21st-century Australian inventors
Living people
Australian cavers
Australian underwater divers
Cave diving explorers
People from New South Wales